"I'm in the Mood" is a song by American singer and songwriter CeCe Peniston, released in December 1993 as the first commercial single from her second studio album, Thought 'Ya Knew (1994). The composition scored the singer her fourth number one on the US Billboard Hot Dance Music/Club Play chart, and also entered the top 10 of the Billboard Hot R&B chart, peaking at number seven. On the Billboard Hot 100, the song peaked at number 32 and made number 16 on the UK Top 75. In a 2011 interview for Boy Culture, TypePad's blogging service, Peniston disclosed that she had actually expected a better reception of the single.

A special extended remix of "Keep On Walkin'", one of the Peniston's previous singles, appeared on the B-side.

Critical reception
Jose F. Promis from AllMusic described "I'm in the Mood" as "fun, jazzy, finger-snapping R&B". Upon the release, Larry Flick from Billboard declared it as "a chipper, hiybound jack/pop tune that is rhythmically similar to her previous hit, "Keep On Walkin'". The difference lies within the song's bouncy chorus and in her more flexible, well-developed vocal." He concluded, "Excellent single is proof that lightning can certainly strike twice." Dave Sholin from the Gavin Report wrote, "Who better to get audiences in a groove mood than the one-time Miss Phoenix? Some very cool mixes are sure to keep this track fresh all the way into summer." Another editor, Annette M. Lai, named it one of the "outstanding" tracks of the Thought 'Ya Knew album. Pan-European magazine Music & Media commented, "Finally, CeCe is riding the radio charts again with a dance single which at first seems to lack that pop sparkle of her old song material. Consider that the logical process of maturity." 

Andy Beevers from Music Week stated, "After lying low in 1993, Ce Ce Peniston is poised to kick off 1994 in fine style with this single" that is "almost as infectious as her first hits", and "a Top 40 contender." A reviewer from People Magazine said that her "triumphant wail" is "harnessed" on the song, viewing it as "conneet-the-dots dance pop". Tim Jeffery from the RM Dance Update wrote that Peniston "seems to have got that knack of combining impossibly catchy and uplifting songs with dancefloor appeal". Mark Frith from Smash Hits gave it four out of five, complimenting it as "another energic piano-laden number with her trademark wonderful vocals and one of those nagging basslines." Mike Joyce from The Washington Post felt songs like "I'm in the Mood" "are catchy and clever dance tracks, all right, and savvy too".

Credits and personnel
 CeCe Peniston – lead/back vocal, vocal arrangement, executive producer
 Steven Nikolas – writer, vocal arrangement
 Brendon Sibley – writer, vocal arrangement
 Carsten Schack – writer, mix, producer
 Kenneth Karlin – writer, producer
 Mich Hedin Hansen  – writer, co-producer
 Steve Hurley – writer, remix, edits, additional producer
 David Morales – reproduction, mix, additional drums, percussion
 Marc Williams – remix
 Jere M.C. – remix
 Sir Jinx – remix
 Dave Way – mix

 Johny Rogers – additional keyboards
 Eric Kupper – keyboard programming
 Jamie Principle – additional edits
 Rodney Miller – additional guitar
 Scott Ahaus – remix engineer
 Jeff Lewis – engineer
 David Sussman – engineer
 Doug Micheal – engineer
 Darryl D. Dobson – engineer
 Greg Mull – engineer
 Manny Lehman – executive producer
 Damon Jones – executive producer
 Studio 56 – studio
 Westlake, Los Angeles, California – studio
 River North Recording, Chicago, Illinois – mix
 Quad Studios, (New York City) – mix
 Tanglewood Studios, Chicago – mix
 Larabee Studios, West L.A., California – mix
 Star Trax Recording, Chicago, Illinois – mix
 Steven and Brendon Songs/Casadida Publishing (ASCAP) – publisher
 EMI Virgin Music – publisher, admin

Additional credits
 "Crazy Love" 
 "Keep On Walkin'" 
 "Searchin'"

Track listings and formats

 7", US, #31458 0498 7
 "I'm in the Mood" (East 87th St. Mix) - 4:11
 "Keep On Walkin'" (Special Extended Mix) - 5:36

 7", UK, #580 454-7
 CS, UK, #580 454-4
 CD3, JP, Promo, #PODM-1021
 "I'm in the Mood" (UK Radio Mix) - 3:55
 "I'm in the Mood" (In Da Soul 7" Mix) - 4:20

 CD, DE, #580 498-2
 "I'm in the Mood" (East 87th St. Mix) - 4:11
 "I'm in the Mood" (UK Radio Mix) - 3:55

 CD, AU, #580 460-2
 "I'm in the Mood" (East 87th St. Mix) - 4:11
 "I'm in the Mood" (Jinx Mix) - 4:29
 "I'm in the Mood" (Bad Yard Edit) - 3:57

 CS, US, #31458 0460 4
 "I'm in the Mood" (East 87th St. Mix) - 4:11
 "I'm in the Mood" (Jinx Mix) - 4:29
 "I'm in the Mood" (Bad Yard Club) - 7:24

 12", EU & UK, #580 455-1
 "I'm in the Mood" (Bad Yard Mix) - 7:10
 "I'm in the Mood" (East 87th St. 12" Mix) - 6:19
 "I'm in the Mood" (In Da Soul 12" Mix) - 4:48
 "Searchin'" (Silk In The House Mix) - 6:27

 MCD, EU, #580 499-2
 "I'm in the Mood" (East 87th St. Mix) - 4:11
 "I'm in the Mood" (UK Radio Mix) - 3:55
 "I'm in the Mood" (Jinx Mix) - 4:29
 "I'm in the Mood" (In Da Soul 12" Mix) - 4:48

 MCD, US, #31458 0483 2
 "I'm in the Mood" (East 87th St. Mix) - 4:11
 "I'm in the Mood" (Bad Yard Club) - 7:24
 "I'm in the Mood" (Original Mix) - 4:08
 "Keep On Walkin'" (Special Extended Mix) - 5:36

 12", US, #31458 0461 1
 "I'm in the Mood" (Bad Yard Club) - 7:24
 "I'm in the Mood" (Classic Vocal Mix) - 9:09
 "I'm in the Mood" (East 87th St. 12" Mix) - 6:19
 "I'm in the Mood" (Old Skool 12" Mix) - 6:10
 "I'm in the Mood" (In Da Soul 12" Mix) - 4:48
 "I'm in the Mood" (The Mood Mix) - 7:23

 MCD, UK, #580 455-2
 MCD, UK, Promo, #580 455-2DJ
 "I'm in the Mood" (UK Radio Mix) - 3:55
 "I'm in the Mood" (East 87th St. Mix) - 4:11
 "I'm in the Mood" (Bad Yard Mix) - 7:10
 "I'm in the Mood" (Classic Vocal Mix) - 9:09
 "I'm in the Mood" (East 87th St. 12" Mix) - 6:19
 "I'm in the Mood" (In Da Soul 12" Mix) - 4:48

 MCD, US, Promo, #31458 8234 2
 "I'm in the Mood" (East 87th St. Mix) - 4:11
 "I'm in the Mood" (Old Skool 12" Mix) - 6:10
 "I'm in the Mood" (In Da Soul 7" Mix) - 4:20
 "I'm in the Mood" (Jinx Mix) - 4:29
 "I'm in the Mood" (Original Mix) - 4:08
 "I'm in the Mood" (Bad Yard Edit) - 3:57

 12", EU, Double, Promo, #AMYDJ455
 12", UK, Double, Promo, #AMY 455 DJ
 "I'm in the Mood" (Bad Yard Mix) - 7:10
 "I'm in the Mood" (Classic Vocal Mix) - 9:09
 "I'm in the Mood" (East 87th St. 12" Mix) - 6:19
 "I'm in the Mood" (In Da Soul 12" Mix) - 4:48
 "I'm in the Mood" (Bad Yard Club) - 7:24
 "I'm in the Mood" (The Mood Mix) - 7:23
 "I'm in the Mood" (Old Skool 12" Mix) - 6:10
 "I'm in the Mood" (In Da Soul Instrumental) - 3:22

 12", US, Double, Promo, #31458 8226 1
 "I'm in the Mood" (The Mood Mix) - 7:23
 "I'm in the Mood" (Classic Vocal Mix) - 9:09
 "I'm in the Mood" (East 87th St. 12" Mix) - 6:19
 "I'm in the Mood" (Old Skool 12" Mix) - 6:10
 "I'm in the Mood" (In Da Soul 12" Mix) - 4:48
 "I'm in the Mood" (Hip Hop Mix) - 4:28
 "I'm in the Mood" (East 87th Instrumental) - 4:26
 "I'm in the Mood" (In Da Soul Instrumental) - 3:22
 "I'm in the Mood" (The Mood Mix) - 7:23
 "I'm in the Mood" (Bad Yard Dub) - 6:53
 "I'm in the Mood" (Old Skool Instrumental) - 4:48

Charts

Weekly charts

Year-end charts

See also
 List of number-one dance singles of 1994 (U.S.)

References

General

 Specific

External links
 

1993 singles
CeCe Peniston songs
Songs written by Soulshock
Songs written by Cutfather
Song recordings produced by Soulshock and Karlin
Songs written by Kenneth Karlin
1993 songs
A&M Records singles